State Route 564, also known as SR 564, is a state highway in northern Arizona serving Navajo National Monument.  This highway travels from U.S. Route 160 to Betatakin Ruin; SR 564 derives its number from the former route number of the adjacent stretch of US 160, U.S. Route 164.  SR 564 ends at Betatakin; smaller roads travel beyond to Keet Seel.

Route description
SR 564 is a  highway in northern Arizona that connects the Navajo National Monument with US 160.  The southern terminus is located at an intersection with US 160 and BIA Route 41, a road maintained by the Bureau of Indian Affairs (BIA).  SR 564 heads generally north from this intersection as it heads towards the Navajo National Monument.  Just prior to reaching its northern terminus, the highway intersects BIA Route 221.  It leaves this intersection as it comes to an end at the monument.

History
SR 564 was designated as an access road to the Navajo National Monument in 1970.  The highway received this specific designation as a result of being the fifth spur route of SR 64.  SR 64 would later be redesignated as US 160, but SR 564 would retain its designation.

Junction list

References

External links

 SR 564 at Arizona Roads

564
Transportation in Navajo County, Arizona